Noël Coward at Las Vegas is a 1955 live album by Noël Coward.

This was Coward's first appearance on the Las Vegas Strip, with Coward claiming that the dates gave him "one of the most sensational successes of my career, and to pretend that I am not absolutely delighted would be idiotic." Life magazine wrote that Coward was paid $40,000 per week for the engagements.  Coward was accompanied by Peter Matz, who also provided the orchestrations, Matz arranged Coward's next live album, Noël Coward in New York.

The album reached No. 14 on the Billboard albums chart.

Track listing 
 Noël Coward Medley ("I'll See You Again", "Dance Little Lady", "Poor Little Rich Girl", "A Room With A View", "Someday I'll Find You", "I'll Follow My Secret Heart", "If Love Were All", "Play, Orchestra, Play") –  5:19
 "Uncle Harry" – 3:45
 "Loch Lomond" (Traditional) – 2:28
 "A Bar on the Piccola Marina" – 4:48
 "World Weary" – 3:11
 "Nina" (Coward, Cole Porter) – 4:22
 "Mad Dogs and Englishmen" – 3:14
 "Matelot" – 4:35
 "Alice Is At It Again" – 3:33
 "A Room with a View" – 3:04
 "Let's Do It, Let's Fall in Love" (Porter) – 4:30
 "The Party's Over Now" – 1:44

All music and lyrics written by Noël Coward unless otherwise indicated.

Personnel 
 Noël Coward – vocal
 Peter Matz – piano, arranger

References 

Noël Coward albums
1955 live albums
Columbia Records live albums
Albums arranged by Peter Matz
Albums conducted by Peter Matz
Live albums recorded in the Las Vegas Valley